Omer Buaron (born  27 June 1992) is an Israeli footballer who plays for Hapoel Ra'anana.

References

External links
 

1992 births
Living people
Israeli Jews
Israeli footballers
Beitar Nes Tubruk F.C. players
Hapoel Herzliya F.C. players
Hapoel Nir Ramat HaSharon F.C. players
Hapoel Hadera F.C. players
Hapoel Beit She'an F.C. players
Maccabi Netanya F.C. players
Ironi Nesher F.C. players
F.C. Haifa Robi Shapira players
Hapoel Iksal F.C. players
Beitar Tel Aviv Bat Yam F.C. players
Hapoel Petah Tikva F.C. players
Hapoel Ramat Gan F.C. players
Hapoel Acre F.C. players
Bnei Yehuda Tel Aviv F.C. players
Hapoel Kfar Saba F.C. players
Hapoel Ra'anana A.F.C. players
Liga Leumit players
Israeli Premier League players
Footballers from Netanya
Association football forwards